The women's rhythmic gymnastics group all-around competition at the 2015 European Games was held at the National Gymnastics Arena, Baku on 17 June 2015.

Results

References 

Women's rhythmic group all-around
2015 in women's gymnastics